Ganawamaya is an extinct genus of quadrupedal kangaroos that lived in Australia. 

Species include:

 G. acris 
 G. aediculis 
 G. gillespieae 
 G. couperi

References

Prehistoric marsupial genera
Prehistoric macropods
Fossil taxa described in 1992